Heptapleurum is a genus of flowering plants in the family Araliaceae, native to the Indian Subcontinent, Tibet, southern China, Hainan, Taiwan, Southeast Asia, Malesia, Papuasia, Japan, and Australia. It was resurrected from Schefflera in 2020.

Species

References

 
Araliaceae
Apiales genera